Off the Hillbilly Hook is an extended play released by the American country music group Trailer Choir. It was released on June 9, 2009 via Show Dog Nashville, now part of Show Dog-Universal Music. The album contains the singles "Off the Hillbilly Hook," "What Would You Say," "Rockin' the Beer Gut" and "Rollin' Through the Sunshine." These latter three songs all charted on Hot Country Songs between 2009 and 2010. "Rockin' the Beer Gut" also charted at number 12 on the Bubbling Under Hot 100 chart.

Track listing
"Rockin' the Beer Gut" (Butter) – 3:06
"Rollin' Through the Sunshine" (Butter, Big Vinny, Isaac Rich) – 3:15
"In My Next 5 Beers" (Butter, Big Vinny, Rick, Thom Shepherd) – 2:42
"What Would You Say" (Butter, Big Vinny, David Fortney) – 3:40
"Last Man Standing" (Butter, Chance, John Kromer, Scott Lynch) – 3:31
"Off the Hillbilly Hook" (Butter, Big Vinny, Jewels Hanson) – 3:09

Critical reception
Steve Leggett of AllMusic gave this EP a three-and-a-half star review, saying that it was "catchy and commercial," and Greg Yost of Country Standard Time said "it is clear that not only is this trio funny, but Trailer Choir has the songwriting, vocal and music talent to sustain a career."

Personnel
Acoustic Guitar - Ilya Toshinsky
Backing Vocals - Weston Harvey
Bass - David Santos
Drums - Greg Morrow
Electric Guitar - Jerry McPherson
Electric Guitar - Kenny Greenburg
Harmonica - Stacie Collins
Keyboards- Tim Akers
Percussion - Eric Darken

Chart performance

References

2009 debut EPs
Trailer Choir albums
Show Dog-Universal Music EPs